The 2010 Israel Open was a professional tennis tournament played on outdoor hard courts. It was part of the 2010 ATP Challenger Tour. It took place in Ramat HaSharon, Israel between May 3 and May 8, 2010.

Entrants

Seeds

 Rankings are as of April 26, 2010.

Other entrants
The following players received wildcards into the singles main draw:
  Gilad Ben Zvi
  Noam Okun
  Rainer Schüttler
  Amir Weintraub

The following players received entry from the qualifying draw:
  Grigor Dimitrov
  Tal Eros
  Mikhail Ledovskikh
  Juho Paukku

Champions

Singles

 Conor Niland def.  Thiago Alves, 5–7, 7–6(5), 6–3

Doubles

 Jonathan Erlich /  Andy Ram def.   Alexander Peya /  Simon Stadler, 6–4, 6–3

External links
Official website
ITF search 

Israel Open
Tennis tournaments in Israel
2010 in Israeli sport
Israel Open